The Kuznetsov NK-87 is a low-bypass turbofan engine rated at 127.5 kN (28,700 lbf) thrust. It powers the Lun-class ekranoplan. It is made by the soviet Kuznetsov Design Bureau (now JSC Kuznetsov).

Applications
 Lun-class ekranoplan
 Spasatel (proposed)

Specifications (NK-87)

See also

References 

Low-bypass turbofan engines
Kuznetsov aircraft engines
1980s turbofan engines